Rosepig is an EP by New Zealand band Superette, released in 1994.

Track listing
Killer Clown - 3:53   
The Horse - 2:41   
Slide - 3:53   
Disappear - 2:32   
Beetle - 4:30

Personnel
Ben Howe - bass, vocals, guitar
Greta Anderson - drums, vocals
Dave Mulcahy - guitar, vocals, piano

References

Superette (band) albums
1994 EPs